Entebbe Children's Surgical Hospital (ECSH) is a specialized children's pediatric surgery hospital in Uganda. It is a private hospital, owned and operated by Emergency, an international NGO that offers "free medical treatment to the victims of war, poverty and landmines".

Location
The hospital is located in the village of  Banga, in the city of Entebbe, in Wakiso District, in the Central Region of Uganda.

Construction
The hospital was designed by Renzo Piano and built in association with TAM Associates. The Kampala Post, a Ugandan online publication, reported the construction cost to be USh117 billion in 2021 (approx. €29 million).

Overview
The ECSH is a specialized pediatric surgery hospital owned and administered by Emergency, the international non-government organization. ECSH serves children with surgical disabilities regardless of their ethnic background, religious affiliation, or ability to pay. Opened on 19 April 2021, the hospital has bed capacity of 72 patients.

When fully operational, the hospital will employ 385 local people. Of these, 179 (46.5 percent) are medical staff, including technicians, pharmacists, nurses and surgeons. The remaining 206 (53.5 percent) are administrative staff, including social workers, accountants, receptionists, drivers, cooks, security, cleaners and laundry personnel, among others. 

The hospital expects to hire 36 expatriate medical staff and 143 Ugandan medical staff at full capacity. Of the 206 non-medical staff, 196 (95 percent) are expected to be Ugandan and 10 (5 percent) are expected to be expatriates.

Training
One of the hospital's long term objectives is to train Ugandans, both medical and non-medical. In turn the trained staff will  "improve pediatric surgery and medical care in Uganda", and will over time train other workers to do the same.

Other considerations
The Uganda Ministry of Health participated in the planning of this hospital. The Ugandan government donated the land where the hospital was built. The government is also expected to fund 20 percent of the hospital's operational expenses, annually.

See also
Salam Centre for Cardiac Surgery
Hospitals in Uganda
CURE Children's Hospital of Uganda

References

External links
 Official Website
 Detailed Hospital Profile As of April 2021.
 Architectural Details of Entebbe Children's Surgical Hospital

Hospital buildings completed in 2021
Hospitals in Uganda
Entebbe
Wakiso District
Hospitals established in 2021
2021 establishments in Uganda